Bryan Guy Adams   (born  November 5, 1959) is a Canadian musician, singer, songwriter, composer, and photographer. He has been cited as one of the best-selling music artists of all time, and is estimated to have sold between 75 million and more than 100 million records and singles worldwide. Adams was the most played artist on Canadian radio in the 2010s and has had 25 top-15 singles in Canada and a dozen or more in each of the US, UK, and Australia.

Adams joined his first band at age 15, and at age 20 his eponymous debut album was released. He rose to fame in North America with the 1983 top ten album Cuts Like a Knife, featuring its title track and the ballad "Straight From the Heart", his first US top ten hit. His 1984 Canadian and US number one album, Reckless (which became the first album by a Canadian to be certified diamond in Canada), made him a global star with tracks like "Run to You" and "Summer of '69", both top ten hits in the US and Canada, and the power ballad "Heaven", a US number one hit. His 1987 album Into the Fire, with its US and Canadian top ten song, "Heat of the Night", rose to number two in Canada and the top ten in the US and several other countries. In 1989, he ended the decade by co writing with fellow Canadian songwriter Jim Vallance and American songwriter Diane Warren "When the Night Comes", played at the end credits of that year's Tom Selleck starred crime drama, An Innocent Man.

In 1991, Adams released "(Everything I Do) I Do It for You", which went to number one in at least 19 countries, including for 16 and 18 straight weeks in the UK, and Europe overall, both records. It is one of the best-selling singles of all time, having sold more than 15 million copies worldwide. The song was included on Adams' Waking Up the Neighbours (1991), a worldwide number one album that sold 16 million copies, including being certified diamond in Canada. Another major hit off the album was the Canadian number one and US number two hit "Can't Stop This Thing We Started", which also went top ten in several other countries. Beginning in 1993, Adams' hits were mostly ballads, including the worldwide number one or two hits "Please Forgive Me" (1993); "All for Love" (1993); and "Have You Ever Really Loved a Woman?" (1995), the latter two topping the U.S. Billboard Hot 100. Adam's 1993 greatest hits compilation album, So Far So Good, topped the charts in numerous countries selling 13 million copies worldwide, including being certified 6× platinum in Canada, 5× platinum in the US, and 14× platinum in Australia.

In 1996, Adams' 18 til I Die was a top five album in many countries, but only reached number 31 in the US. He did duets with Barbra Streisand ("I Finally Found Someone" (1996), his last US top ten hit) and Melanie C ("When You're Gone" (1998), an international top five hit). In the 1990s, Adams had six European Radio Airplay number one songs for 32 weeks, the fourth and third most, respectively; and three number one songs on the European Sales Chart for 29 weeks total, the most weeks of any artist. Since 1999, Adams released eight albums, three reaching number one in Canada, and the last three reaching the top three in the UK, Germany and elsewhere in Europe.

In 2008, Adams was ranked 38th on the list of all-time top artists on the Billboard Hot 100. Adams has won 20 Juno Awards and a Grammy Award for Best Song Written for a Motion Picture or Television amongst 16 Grammy nominations, and has been nominated for five Golden Globe Awards and three Academy Awards for his songwriting for films. Adams has been inducted into the Hollywood Walk of Fame, Canada's Walk of Fame, the Canadian Broadcast Hall of Fame, the Canadian Music Hall of Fame and the Canadian Songwriters Hall of Fame. On 1 May 2010, Adams received the Governor General's Performing Arts Award for his 30 years of contributions to the arts.

Life and career

Early life 
Bryan Guy Adams was born on 5 November 1959 in Kingston, Ontario, the son of Elizabeth Jane (née Watson) and Conrad J. Adams, an English couple who emigrated to Canada from Plymouth in the 1950s. One of his grandmothers was born in Malta. His father, a Sandhurst officer in the British Army, joined the Canadian Army and later worked as a United Nations peacekeeping observer and Canadian foreign service diplomat.

Adams travelled with his parents to diplomatic postings in Lisbon (where he attended the American International School of Lisbon) and Vienna (where he attended the American International School of Vienna) during the 1960s, and to Tel Aviv during the early 1970s. Raised in Ottawa, he attended Colonel By Secondary School in the Beacon Hill neighbourhood of Ottawa. In 1974, Adams, his mother, and younger brother Bruce moved to North Vancouver while his father was posted abroad. While there, he attended Argyle Secondary School and Sutherland Secondary School.

Early career 
Adams bought his first electric guitar at the age of 12 in Reading, an Italian brand from Gherson, based on a Fender stratocaster. In an interview with music magazine Guitar World, Adams said: "I bought an imitation Les Paul at a Five and Dime store in Ottawa, Canada, in 1971," Adams recalled. "Before that, I had an imitation Strat which I bought in Reading, England in 1970."

It felt real at the time to have a Les Paul, even though I'm a massive Ritchie Blackmore fan - still am. I was heavily into Humble Pie's Rockin' the Fillmore album at the time, and both Peter Frampton and Steve Marriott were on Les Pauls. It's rock guitar heaven, that album."  He left school to play in a group called "Shock" and used the funds his parents had saved for his college education to buy an Estey grand piano to tinker with. At one point he sold pet food and worked as a dishwasher in a restaurant, which paid the rent. He got into different bands such as CCR and Deep Purple, and attended concerts by Led Zeppelin, T. Rex, Elton John, and Tina Turner. He started working in the Vancouver music scene with bands and as a studio session singer. At the age of 15, he became the vocalist for a pub band, Sweeney Todd.
 Adams recorded "Roxy Roller" which came in at No. 99 on the US charts. This new incarnation of the band also released an album If Wishes Were Horses (1977) with Adams billed as "Bryan Guy Adams" on vocals. Adams left the band at age 16. In 1978, at age 18, Adams met Jim Vallance through a mutual friend in a Vancouver Long and McQuade musical instrument store. Vallance was the former drummer and principal songwriter for Vancouver-based rock band Prism, and had recently quit that band to focus on a career as a studio musician and songwriter. They agreed to meet at Vallance's home studio a few days later. This proved to be the beginning of a partnership which was prolific and continuous through the 1980s, together they co-wrote for Adams and a long list of recordings for other artists, including Kiss, Tina Turner, Joe Cocker, Johnny Hallyday, Bonnie Raitt, Rod Stewart, Bonnie Tyler, Loverboy, Carly Simon and Neil Diamond to name a few, and while discontinuous, is still in existence.

Later in 1978, Adams signed to A&M records for one dollar. A&M remixed one of Adams' demos as a disco song "Let Me Take You Dancing", featuring Adams' vocals sped up to meet the 122 BPM dance tempo. The song made the Canadian RPM chart in March 1979 along with its B-side "Don't Turn Me Away". In 1979, he made an agreement with Canadian manager Bruce Allen, who at that time also worked for Bachman–Turner Overdrive and Loverboy; to this day Allen is still his manager.

1980s 
Adams's self-titled debut album, mostly co-written with Jim Vallance, was released in February 1980. With the exception of "Remember" and "Wastin' Time", most of the album was recorded in October and November 1979 at Manta Studios and co-produced by Adams and Vallance. The album was certified gold in Canada in 1986. Singles released from it included "Give Me Your Love", "Remember" and "Hidin' from Love", with the latter having the most success, reaching number 64 on the Canadian RPM Current Hit Radio chart; none reached the US Billboard Hot 100.

Adams's second album, You Want It You Got It, was released in 1981 and contained the FM album-oriented rock radio hit, "Lonely Nights", which reached number three on the US Album Rock Tracks chart. The same song was reinterpreted by Uriah Heep for the album Head First, released in 1983. The most successful song off the album in Canada was "Fits Ya Good" which reached the top 30 on the RPM Top 40 Chart; it also reached number 15 on the US Album Rock Tracks chart. From January to May 1982, Adams spent months traveling on his "You Want It You Got It Tour"; within a few months the album had been picked up across the United States and Adams was soon on tour opening for The Kinks and Foreigner.

Cuts Like a Knife, which was released in January 1983, was Adams's breakout album. "Straight from the Heart" was the first single released from the album; it reached number 10 on the Billboard Hot 100, number 20 on the Canadian RPM Top 40 chart, and number one on the Canadian Adult Contemporary Chart. In September 1983, Bonnie Tyler released her version for the studio album Faster Than the Speed of Night. The second single, "Cuts Like a Knife", rose to number 15 on the Billboard Hot 100, number six on the US Album Rock Tracks Chart, and number 12 on the Canadian RPM Top 40 Chart. The third single, "This Time", was also a top 30 hit in the US and Canada. Overseas, the latter two singles were both Top 20 hits in New Zealand, but there was little success in any other countries, aside from "Straight From the Heart" and "This Time" reaching the top 50 in the UK. Three other tracks, "Take Me Back", "I'm Ready" and "The Only One", also received substantial airplay on North American rock radio stations, each making the US Album Rock Tracks chart. The album peaked at number eight on both the Billboard 200 album chart and in Canada, achieving three times platinum status in Canada, platinum status in the United States and gold status in Australia. 

In October, Adams joined Jim Vallance at the Yamaha Music Festival in Japan. The Music Express national popular opinion poll voted him Canada's best male singer for 1982. In 1983, Adams travelled to America, opening for Journey and performing on over 100 dates in five months. On 30 July 1983, he performed at Day on the Green, sharing the stage with Journey, Triumph, Eddie Money and Night Ranger.

A&M released the film soundtrack of the album A Night in Heaven, with the power ballad "Heaven" on it. "Heaven" reached number one on the Billboard Hot 100 in June 1985. Among his awards for 1983 were the Juno Award for Best Male Vocalist.

The album Reckless was released in late 1984, and peaked at number one on both the Billboard 200 and the Canadian Album Chart, while reaching number two in Australia and number seven in the UK. The album featured six singles: "Run to You", "Somebody", "Heaven", "Summer of '69", "One Night Love Affair", and "It's Only Love", a duet with the female star and "Queen of Rock 'n' Roll" Tina Turner. All six singles peaked in the Top 15 of the US Billboard Hot 100, only the third album to achieve this with the rockers "Run to You" (number six) and "Summer of '69" (number five) peaking in the top ten, and the ballad "Heaven" reaching number one. "Run To You" was the most successful single at album-oriented rock stations in the US, as it spent four weeks at the top of the mainstream rock tracks chart; "Somebody" reached number one for a single week on that chart; while "It's Only Love" and "One Light Love Affair" each rose to number 7. "Summer of '69" had gotten a minor amount of airplay upon the initial release of the album, making it ineligible to re-chart on the mainstream rock track chart when it was released as single in summer 1985.

"Run To You" was the biggest hit off Reckless in Canada reaching number four, with "Summer of '69" and "Heaven" both peaking at number 11, "Somebody" peaking at number 13, "It's Only Love" hitting number 14, and "One Night Love Affair" reaching number 19. "Summer of 69" also reached the top ten in New Zealand and Norway, and the Top 20 in Sweden, Australia and Austria, but only peaked at number 42 in the UK and number 62 in West Germany. Adams has stated that "Summer of '69" was not a success when initially released in the UK because British radio stations did not add it to their play lists like they had "Run To You". However, it gained popularity over time and was certified Platinum (600,000) in sales in the UK in 2019, and its Spotify streams were at 280 million as of 2019, twice that of "(Everything I Do) I Do For You." In the Low Countries it achieved its maximum popularity in 1990 when it peaked at number 4 in 17 weeks on the Netherlands' singles chart, and reached number 8 on the Belgium chart.

"It's Only Love" was nominated for a Grammy Award for Best Rock Vocal Performance by a Duo or Group in 1986. In 1986, the song won an MTV award for Best Stage Performance. Reckless also earned Adams a Grammy nomination for Best Male Rock Performance. In December 1984, Adams embarked on a two-year world tour to launch the album starting in Canada and United States, then into Japan, Australia, back to the UK, where for dates he supported Tina Turner for her Private Dancer Tour, and again to Canada. After winning four Juno Awards, he headed south towards the American West Coast, culminating with two dates at the Paladium in Los Angeles. Reckless eventually went Diamond in sales in Canada, the first album by a Canadian artist to do so, while reaching 5× and 3× Platinum in the US and UK. Reckless has sold over 12 million copies worldwide, and won the Juno Award for Album of the Year.

1985 was an intense and demanding year. On 10 February, he recorded the Northern Lights single "Tears Are Not Enough", an improvised supergroup with Joni Mitchell, Neil Young and other Canadian artists. Adams was the author of the lyrics and the album, the mission was to raise funds to help the 1983-85 famine in Ethiopia. The song was issued as a single by Columbia Records in March of that year, and quickly reached number one on the Canadian Top 40 chart. It also finished number one on the year-end Canadian charts for 1985. The song's video also received extensive airplay on MuchMusic. Participation was incredible: the single went triple platinum immediately, although independently recorded by the USA for Africa project, it was included in the full-length We Are the World album. On 13 July, Adams attended the Live Aid concert, from Philadelphia. He took the stage at JFK Stadium in front of over 100,000 people and the band played "Kids Wanna Rock", "Summer Of '69" and "Cuts Like A Knife", before concluding with "Tears Are Not Enough". Bryan Adams sang a small passage of this song on Live 8 in Barrie during All For Love.

In September 1985, Adams worked on Roger Daltrey's sixth solo album Under a Raging Moon. The album was a tribute to The Who's drummer Keith Moon, who died in 1978. Adams co-wrote two tracks for the album: "Let Me Down Easy" and "Rebel". The track "Let Me Down Easy" was a Top 15 Hit on Billboard's Mainstream Rock Tracks. Nearly 30 years later, Adams would release his own version of "Let Me Down Easy" on a 30-year anniversary version of Reckless.

In January 1986, Adams provided the ending background vocals to the song "Don't Forget Me (When I'm Gone)" by Canadian rock band Glass Tiger for their debut album The Thin Red Line. It reached number one in Canada and number two in the United States.

His follow-up album to Reckless was Into the Fire (1987). This album contained the hit songs "Heat of the Night", which went to the top ten in both Canada and the US, and "Hearts on Fire". In December 1987, Adams contributed the song "Run Rudolph Run" to the album A Very Special Christmas, which benefited the Special Olympics. The album was certified quadruple platinum by the Recording Industry Association of America for shipment of four million copies in the United States, is the 19th best-selling Christmas/holiday album in the United States during the SoundScan era are 2,520,000 copies sold. In May 1988, Tommy Mandel joined the Adams band as new keyboardist. 

In June 1989, teams up with famed producer/composer Robert John "Mutt" Lange at London's Olympic Studios to write more material for the upcoming LP. Bryan attended a press conference on 8 June to launch the North American release of Rainbow Warriors, and also joined artists to re-record the classic Deep Purple hit "Smoke On The Water" in aid of Armenian earthquake victims. In August 1989, he recorded the backup vocals for the Belinda Carlisle song "Whatever It Takes" from the Runaway Horses album. Also during that time, Adams contributed to Mötley Crüe's work on the album Dr. Feelgood, doing the backing vocals of "Sticky Sweet" and Charlie Sexton doing the backing vocals of "Don't Look Back" from the Charlie Sexton album. In October 1989, Adams performed two club benefit concerts at 86 Street Music Hall in Vancouver on 18 & 19. "A Night for the Environment" raised $40,000.00 for four local environmental groups. Bryan is nominated for a Gemini Award for Best Performance (Music) for CBS's "Live In Belgium" television special. In November 1989, Adams flew to London, England on the 18th for press interviews for the upcoming shows of New Year's Eve in Japan. He resumes writing material for the album with Mutt Lange and attends Tina Turner's 50th birthday party at London's prestigious Reform Club.

In December 1989, the long-awaited first live LP was released. Entitled Live! Live! Live!, it was recorded live at the Rock Werchter festival on 3 July 1988, in Werchter, Belgium. Adams returned to Little Mountain Sound Studios mid-month to record even more material for the next album. The release date was tentatively scheduled for April 1990.

1990s 

He returned to London and joined Eric Carmen in the studio to record the backing vocals for "Feels Like Forever", a song written by Adams for Eric's then-upcoming LP. Production of the Adams project continued with Mutt Lange in England for the next two months. In 1990, he received the prestigious Order Of British Columbia. He starred in two European festivals in Midfyns and Rosskilde, Denmark, on 28 June. Adams added vocal tracks on the melody of David Foster's "River Of Love" in his home studio in Vancouver. On 21 July 1990, Adams took part in Roger Waters's concert production of The Wall - Live In Berlin, to commemorate the fall of the Berlin Wall eight months earlier. Adams performed the Pink Floyd track "Young Lust." A live album and video of the concert was released in August 1990.

Adams performed on 28 September 1990 in Chile in the huge 55,000-seat Estadio Nacional Julio Martínez Prádanos in Santiago, then headed to Buenos Aires, in Argentina, the next day to perform alongside David Bowie and Mick Taylor at Estadio Monumental Antonio Vespucio Liberti.

At the beginning of 1991, Adams returned to London on the sixth to start mixing with Mutt Lange. In the months of February and March 1991, the recording and mixing continued in London. The Law recorded 'Nature Of The Beast' – a melody written by Adams and Vallance. Adams joins them in the studio to lend vocals and guitar tracks. 

In April 1991, Adams and Mutt Lange wrote and recorded "(Everything I Do) I Do It For You" for the Robin Hood: Prince Of Thieves soundtrack. In May 1991, directed by Julien Temple, the video for the song was shot in Sheffield, England on 17 and 18 May. Rehearsals for the next European tour began with ZZ Top. In June 1991, a video was shot for the first single album "Can't Stop This Thing We Started" 'directed by Kevin Godley at Pinewood Studios in London. On the eighth, Adams kicked off the headlining tour at the "Jubeck Festival" in Germany. On the 17th, he performed a private show for a personal service recently returned from the Gulf War at the Canadian Armed Forces base in Baden Baden, Germany.

On 24 September 1991, the album Waking Up the Neighbours was released. Co-produced by Adams and Robert John "Mutt" Lange, it topped the charts around the world, including in the UK, Canada, Australia and Germany and reached number six on the Billboard 200. It became Adams's second album to be certified Diamond in sales in Canada while being certified 5× platinum in the US. It went on to sell 16 million copies worldwide. Waking up the Neighbors became the first album by a Canadian since Neil Young's 1972 Harvest to reach the top of the album charts in the United Kingdom. Ironically, however, the album was launched in Canada amidst a storm of controversy. The album is also known to have caused controversy in Canada due to the Canadian content system. This indicated that a certain percentage must be broadcast by Canadian music on Canadian radio and television broadcasts. Since Waking Up the Neighbors was largely recorded in England and co-produced by Robert John "Mutt" Lange (originally from Zambia), the album and its songs, under the rules in effect until 1991, were not considered purely Canadian productions. The album managed to reach the top of the Canadian charts. Following Adams' complaints, in September of that year, the Canadian Radio-television and Telecommunications Commission (CRTC) announced that the Canadian content rules would be expanded. The regulation at that time considered collaborative writing between Canadians and non-Canadians to be "Canadian" only where the lyricist and musical composer worked separately and at least one was Canadian.  In protest, Adams briefly threatened to boycott Canada's annual Juno Awards, where his album was eventually almost completely ignored by the awards committee. He did end up winning the Juno International Achievement Award, Canadian Entertainer of the Year (voted on by the public) and Producer of the Year Award.  In September 1991, the regulation was amended to recognize collaborations in which two (or more) contributors each contributed to both lyrics and music, as was the case with Adams and Lange.

The album's first single was the world-wide number one song, the six-and-a-half-minute "(Everything I Do) I Do It for You", which was featured in the motion picture Robin Hood: Prince of Thieves.  "Everything I Do" was released internationally on 12 June, days after the film's premiere, with the initial shipment of 385,000 copies being the largest single shipment in the history of A&M Records. This rock ballad spent a record 16 consecutive weeks at Number One on the UK Singles Chart and seven weeks on top of the Billboard Hot 100. The song also gave him his first Golden Globe Award nomination for Best Song from a Motion Picture. Subsequent singles were the mid-tempo "Can't Stop This Thing We Started" which peaked at number two in the US, the ballad "Do I Have to Say the Words?" which reached number 11 in the US, and in the UK, "Thought I'd Died and Gone to Heaven" was the second most successful single as it peaked at number 8. In Canada, the first three of these singles each reached number one on the Canadian Singles Chart while the latter and the rocker "There Will Never Be Another Tonight" peaked at number 2. The album won many awards including a Grammy Award in 1991 for Best Song Written Specifically for a Motion Picture or for Television. In July 1992, Adams performed at Wembley Stadium in front of 80,000 fans, the largest audience on his tour, with Little Angels and Extreme serving as opening acts. Adams performed for the first time ever in Hungary and Turkey. 

In 1993, Adams collaborated with Rod Stewart and Sting for the single "All for Love" co-written by Adams for the soundtrack of the film The Three Musketeers. The single topped the charts worldwide. On 15 June 1993, along with some rock and blues legends such as Eric Clapton, B.B. King, Ray Charles and Ella Fitzgerald, Adams took the stage of the Apollo Theater in Harlem for a tribute to the great master of soul Sam Cooke. During the gala, he was joined on stage by Smokey Robinson for a duet of "Bring It On Home to Me". In November 1993, Adams released a compilation album entitled So Far So Good, that again topped the charts in numerous countries such as the UK, Canada, Germany and Australia. It was certified 6×, 3×, 6× and 11× Platinum, respectively, in the US, the UK, Canada and Australia. It included a new song called "Please Forgive Me", which became another number one single in Australia, Canada and the UK, as well as reaching number seven in the US (although it reached number one on the Adult Contemporary Chart).

In 1994, Adams embarked on a long tour that takes him to Southeast Asia, during which he became the first Western artist to perform in Vietnam since James Brown played there in 1971 at the end of the Vietnam War. Adams was also invited to participate in another important musical event: the Elvis Aaron Presley – The Tribute concert, held in Memphis in homage to the king of rock 'n' roll Elvis Presley. During the evening, which included dozens of exponents of the most varied musical genres, including Jeff Beck, Jerry Lee Lewis, Michael Bolton, Paul Rodgers, Melissa Etheridge, he sang one of his favorite songs: "Hound Dog". In September 1994, he was invited by Luciano Pavarotti to participate in the benefit concert Pavarotti & Friends. The concert took place in Modena at the "Parco di Piazza D'Armi Novi Sad". They performed with Andreas Vollenweider, Nancy Gustafson, Giorgia and Andrea Bocelli. A compilation album and DVD were released under London Records (now Decca Records) and have sold around 1 million copies worldwide. Adams on that occasion sang songs from his repertoire "Please Forgive Me", "All for Love" featuring Luciano Pavarotti, Andrea Bocelli, Nancy Gustafson, and Giorgia Todrani. Michael Kamen, who co-wrote the song with Adams, conducted the orchestra, engaging in a duet with "Maestro Pavarotti", singing in Neapolitan "'O sole mio", to conclude the concert with "Libiamo ne' lieti calici" with all the artists and singers present at the evening.

It was followed in 1995 by "Have You Ever Really Loved a Woman?". It was a number one in the US, Canada and Australia, as well as a top five hit in the UK and Germany. The single was nominated for the Oscar, Grammy and Golden Globe Award for Best Original Song.

In June 1996, the album 18 til I Die was released. It contained three singles (including two UK top ten singles): "The Only Thing That Looks Good on Me Is You", "Let's Make a Night to Remember" (both reached number one in Canada), and "Have You Ever Really Loved a Woman?". The album features the single "Star". The song is included in the soundtrack of the film Jack; directed by Francis Ford Coppola, with Robin Williams. The film co-stars Diane Lane, Jennifer Lopez, Fran Drescher, Bill Cosby and Brian Kerwin. The album reached the top spot on the UK charts for Adams's third UK number one studio album in a row while also reaching the top ten in several other countries, such as number two in Australia and number four in Canada. The album was less successful in the US only reaching number 31 on the Billboard 200, but was certified platinum in the United States by the RIAA. 18 til I Die was certified three times platinum in Canada and Australia and two times platinum in the UK.
In November 1996, "I Finally Found Someone" was released is a song recorded by Bryan Adams and the American singer Barbra Streisand. The song was part of the soundtrack of Streisand's self-directed film The Mirror Has Two Faces and was nominated for an Academy Awards and Golden Globe Awards.

In November 1997, he participated in writing the song Let's Talk About Love by Celine Dion, which became one of the best-selling albums in history. The song is by the French singer-songwriter and record producer of 1987's Jean-Jacques Goldman "Puisque tu pars", the song was recorded with English lyrics by Adams and Eliot Kennedy as "Let's Talk About Love". In 1999, a demo version of Adams' translation appeared on the single CD "Cloud Number Nine" in 1999. In December 1997, Adams released MTV Unplugged with three new tracks: "Back to You", "A Little Love" and "When You Love Someone". "Back to You" was the first single, followed by "I'm Ready", an acoustic version of the song from the album Cuts Like A Knife. The album was a top ten success in Germany while both singles reached the top 20 in the UK.

On a Day Like Today was released in 1998 and the release coincided with his contract being sold to Interscope Records. On a Day Like Today enjoyed success internationally, entering the top five in Germany and Canada and was certified platinum in the UK. It generated two British top ten singles: "Cloud Number Nine" and "When You're Gone", which featured Melanie C of the Spice Girls and peaked at number 3. The song has sold 830,000 combined equivalent-sales in the UK as of May 2019.

To commemorate the millennium, Adams released The Best of Me, his most comprehensive collection of songs at that time, which included two new songs, the title track "The Best of Me" and the UK number one track "Don't Give Up". The album reached the top ten in Germany and was certified three times platinum in Canada and Platinum in the UK. The single from the album, "The Best of Me" was a successful hit with the exception of the US, where neither the single or the album were released by Interscope Records, the single peaked at 10 on the Canadian Singles Chart on 24 January 2000. On 26 November 1999, he participated as a guest in the celebration of Tina Turner's 60th birthday. It was recorded in London and after 14 years, Turner once again performed with Adams the songs "It's Only Love" and the new song "Without You" on Tina's album Twenty Four Seven, Adams guests on both the title track and "Without You". A DVD Celebrate! Of the evening was released 21 November 2000 Celebrate! - 60th Birthday Special. On the night between 31 December 1999, and 1 January 2000, at Bell Center in Montreal in front of 20,000 people, Adams participated in Celine Dion's "Millennium Concert", to celebrate the arrival of the new millennium. In the evening, at the entrance to the stage he sang "Summer of '69", then he duetted with Celine Dion on the songs "It's Only Love", "When You're Gone" and concluded with" (Everything I Do) I Do It for You ".

2000s 
In October 2000, Adams participated at Madison Square Garden in the concert of Elton John from which the CD and DVD Elton John One Night Only – The Greatest Hits was released. The album, the result of performances over two evenings (in spite of the title "One Night Only"), contains the most popular songs by Elton John performed live, chosen from those performed during the two concerts (therefore it does not contain the full track-list). Many of these are actually duets between the rock star and other famous names in the world music scene: Adams duets with Elton John on the track Sad Songs. On 26 August 2000, he performed at the Slane Festival in front of over 70,000 people, with special appearances by Melanie C, Chicane and Davy Spillane. The concert was also released on CD/DVD. On 27 November of the same year, Adams took part in the benefit concert Live at the Royal Albert Hall organized by The Who (but also open to several other artists), singing a song by the English band, Behind Blue Eyes and See Me, Feel Me with Eddie Vedder. The concert was also released on CD as Live at the Royal Albert Hall. Adams co-wrote and performed the songs for the DreamWorks animated film Spirit: Stallion of the Cimarron in 2002. The songs were included on the film's soundtrack. The most successful single from the soundtrack was "Here I Am", a British top five and German Top 20 hit. The song also gave him his fourth Golden Globe Award nomination for Best Song from a Motion Picture.

In 2004, ARC Weekly released its chart of top pop artists since the last 25 years and Adams came up at number 13 in the chart with four number-one singles, ten top five hits and 17 Top-10 hits. Six years after the release of On a Day Like Today, Room Service was released in September 2004. It topped the charts in Germany and Switzerland and peaked at number four in the UK, selling 440,000 copies in its first week in Europe and thus debuted at number one on Billboard'''s European album chart. The single, "Open Road", was the most successful single from the album and peaked at number one in Canada and number twenty-one in the UK. In May 2008, the album was also released in the US but charted only at number 134 on the Billboard 200. While touring in North America to promote the album, Adams shared the stage for about 25 concert tours with Def Leppard, giving a completely new meaning to the phrase "take me out to the ball game" as co-headliner of the Rock 'N Roll Double-Header Tour. He joined for the first time and performed at 26 minor league baseball parks.

In 2006, Adams co-wrote and performed the theme song "Never Let Go" which was featured in the closing credits of the film The Guardian. In April 2006, he was inducted into the Canadian Music Hall of Fame. Also in 2006, Adams co-wrote the Grammy Award-winning gospel song "Never Gonna Break My Faith" for Aretha Franklin. It was featured in the film Bobby as a duet by Aretha Franklin and Mary J. Blige with the Boys Choir of Harlem and earned him a Golden Globe Nomination in 2007. On 31 July of the same year, together with Billy Joel, he performed in a free concert with an estimated crowd of over 500,000 people in Rome at Via dei Fori Imperiali, with the Colosseum as a background. Adams opened the concert with "So Far So Good", then after about an hour it was Joel's turn to take the stage. At the end the two artists gave the audience three encores, performing "You May Be Right", "Cuts Like a Knife" and "Piano Man" together for the first time.

In May 2007, on the occasion of his 25th concert at the Wembley Arena, he received the "Wembley Square Of Fame" at the plaque in the Square of Fame. A bronze plaque engraved with the name and handprints was unveiled. The place to celebrate the most famous and beloved artists who have made their mark on stage here over the years is located at Wembley Park in London. Adams has performed on several occasions at Wembley Park, 4 times at Wembley Stadium in 1988 (Nelson Mandela 70th Birthday Tribute), 1992 (Waking Up the World Tour), 1996 (18 til I Die Tour), and 1999 (NetAid). At Wembley Arena he has performed 28 times, first on 14 March 1985, in support of Tina Turner. To date, 32 dates have taken place between "Wembley Stadium" and" Wembley Arena".

In 2007, he co-wrote two songs "A Place for Us" and "Another Layer" for the Disney film Bridge to Terabithia.

Adams released his eleventh album, 11, internationally on 17 March 2008. The album was released in the US at Wal-Mart and Sam's Club retail stores on 13 May 2008. The first single released from the album was "I Thought I'd Seen Everything". Adams did an 11-day, 11-country European acoustic promotional tour to kick off the release of the album. The album debuted at number one in Canada (making it his first album to reach that position since Waking Up the Neighbours in 1991) as well as reaching number two in Germany. In the United States, the album charted at number 80. Following the release of the album, the full-band tour started during the summer; on some dates in the United States he shared the stage with the rock band Foreigner and on others with his friend Rod Stewart.

Adams was one of four musicians who were pictured on the second series of the Canadian Recording Artist Series to be issued by Canada Post stamps on 2 July 2009, with estimated one and one-half million Adams stamps printed.

On 26 June 2009, he performed on an episode of CMT Crossroads with Jason Aldean, among the song repertoire of the two singers: "Heaven", "Summer of '69", "Johnny Cash", "She's Country", "Hicktown", "Run to You" to name a few. One of the many highlights from the concert was "Heaven". Aldean poured his heart out singing lead on the song and Adams supported on harmonies during the chorus.

In December 2009, he co-wrote, produced, and performed the song "You've Been a Friend to Me" for the film Old Dogs.

 2010s 
In February 2010, Adams released "One World, One Flame". On 12 February 2010, Adams performed a duet with Nelly Furtado. The song was called "Bang the Drum" and was co-written with Jim Vallance for the opening ceremony for the 2010 Winter Olympic Games in Vancouver, British Columbia. The ceremony was held indoors at BC Place Stadium.

Adams was one of several Canadian musicians to visit Canadian Prime Minister Stephen Harper at his official residence. Originally, the visit was meant to be Adams's plea to the Prime Minister to change copyright laws; instead, Harper turned it into an informal "jam session".

In November 2010, Adams released the acoustic album Bare Bones. It is a live project consisting of twenty songs, to celebrate thirty years of career. The album is the result of two and a half years of acoustic concerts all sold out, offered mainly in many US city theaters in 2010. The booklet shows the recordings made on the dates of Concord, Providence, Binghamton, Orono and Williamsport. To accompany the singer-songwriter on the piano, appears the member of his band Gary Breit. Following the acoustic album, a long tour entitled "The Bare Bones Tour" is organized; has continuity with the previous 11 Tour/Acoustic Show took place in territories around the world, which began in February 2010 and ended in October 2014 for a total of 326 dates. It was certified gold in India a year later.

On 19 February 2011, Adams and his band played in Kathmandu, which was organized by ODC Network and made him the first international artist to perform in Nepal. He performed at the opening ceremony of the 2011 Cricket World Cup on 17 February 2011, in Dhaka, Bangladesh. and also performed in a solo concert in the next day. In August 2013, Live at Sydney Opera House was released; it was recorded during one of the 3 nights at Sydney Opera House, in August 2011, during "The Bare Bones Tour". It is available as a CD / DVD set or separately as a CD, DVD or Blu-ray. In April 2013, To Be Loved, the new album by Michael Bublé, is released. The tracklist includes "After All", one of four original tracks, written by Bryan Adams, Alan Chang, Steven Sater and Jim Vallance, which sees the crooner duet with Adams, his countryman as well as an idol since childhood.

In an interview on 18 March 2014, Adams revealed that he has signed a contract with Verve Records in the US. With one album celebrating the 30th Anniversary of Reckless, a new album of covers. On 30 September 2014, Adams released a new album titled Tracks of My Years. The album reached number one on the Canadian album chart. The album contains cover songs and one original song co-written with Jim Vallance. In July 2014, Adams filmed Bryan Adams in Concert for the American program Great Performances on PBS. It was recorded at the Elgin Theatre in Toronto and first shown on American Public Television on 2 March 2015.

Adams released his first album of all new material in seven years on 16 October 2015. The album, titled Get Up, was co-written with Jim Vallance and produced by Jeff Lynne. On 7 September 2015, it was announced that Adams would be performing at the 2015 AFL Grand Final, along with English singer Ellie Goulding and American musician Chris Isaak. On 31 December 2015, he performed at the Central Hall Westminster in London for the BBC's New Year's Eve, which was broadcast live on BBC One. The concert was divided into two parts, interrupted at the stroke of midnight by traditional fireworks was seen and was seen by about 12 million spectators in Great Britain. On 14 October 2016, as announced by Adams himself in his channels during the summer, the Wembley 1996 DVD was released. This is the recording of his concert, as part of the 18 Til I die tour, held on 27 July 1996, at London's Wembley Stadium, in front of over 70,000 spectators The DVD immediately leaps to the top of the British industry charts.

On 21 September 2017, Adams announced via social media his release of a new compilation album, Ultimate, with two new songs "Please Stay" and the anti-war themed "Ultimate Love", on 3 November 2017. Bryan Adams performed "the Ultimate tour" during the year 2018. He toured Australia, New Zealand, UK, Europe, the US, and Canada. He also brought the ultimate tour 2018 to India in the month of October 2018, where he performed at Ahmedabad, Mumbai, Hyderabad, Bangalore, and Delhi.

Adams and his music are popular in India, where he is a household name for three generations of people, and many people say the first few English phrases mastered by many young Indians are "It was the summer of '69" and "Everything I do, I do it for you." Many music industry executives have said Adams is the most-known foreign music artist in India, with a Universal Music India executive saying in 2011, "The only other performer who comes close is Enrique Iglesias. Bryan is huge. He was one of the first foreigners to stage a large-scale concert in India in the early 1990s, and he has returned to tour India several times. Adams was on the cover of the September 2018 issue of Rolling Stone India, within which they printed an interview with him; the article stated that Adams is "one rock legend whose concerts have created mass frenzy every single time in every single city he's played" in India. It is also reported that "Summer of '69" has been so popular in India for so long that it is "almost a Hindi song now", often the only "western" song that might be allowed to be played at a traditional Indian wedding. One Indian writer wrote "From wedding parties to school farewells, in every gathering of people intoxicated beyond a certain level comes a time when someone slips on 'Summer of '69'. I'll bet you my Aadhaar number that as that song builds, there'll come a point where everyone in the room is triumphantly pumping their fists in the air and screaming, 'Those were the BEST DAYS of my life!'"

In August 2018, Adams performed a duet version of "Summer of '69" with Taylor Swift during her Reputation Tour in Toronto, Canada. Adams released his fourteenth album Shine A Light on 1 March 2019. The album features collaborations with Ed Sheeran and Jennifer Lopez. The album debuted at number one on the Canadian Albums Chart, in the first week of its release, with 44,000 copies sold; its previous number one in Canada going back to the Tracks of My Years album released in October 2014. This was his 11th album in the top ten and the fifth album at the top of the Canadian charts. It reached the second position in the UK Albums Chart, and it was his tenth album to enter the UK Top-10 albums chart. It also debuted in second position in Switzerland, which was his 15th album to enter the top ten of the Swiss charts; second position in Austria; second position in the New Zealand charts; and the third position in Germany.
Shine a Light was certified gold in Canada, and it won the Juno Award for "Best Adult Contemporary Album" in 2020. On 19 June 2020, on the 155th anniversary of the end of Slavery in the United States, the unreleased solo version of "Never Gonna Break My Faith" by Aretha Franklin was released with the participation of RCA Records, RCA Inspiration and Legacy Recordings, featuring a music video that contained contemporary topics, including films about George Floyd and the Black Lives Matter movement.

Adams, while writing this song, did not think it would be performed by Aretha. He conceived something like a hymn and "so that it can express a sense of faith, and that even if you have lost something, there will always be an inner light to guide you." However, then Adams said:"When the song was ready, I told the producers that Aretha was going to sing it – and she did. This solo version had been on my computer for years (about 15 years), and when I heard that the creative director of Sony Music, longtime producer and friend of Aretha's Clive Davis, was making a movie about his life, I sent him this version. The world hadn't heard her full performance yet and it really needed to be heard. I'm so glad it's being released, the world needs this right now."

Adams was among hundreds of artists whose material was destroyed in the 2008 Universal fire. Adams told the Times that he had asked Universal for access to the master tapes for Reckless in 2013 while working on a remastered edition of the album, but had been told that the tapes could not be found. Adams eventually located a safety copy of the album to use on the remaster, and was not made aware of the fire until the Times' initial report on 1 June. On 15 November 2019, Adams released an EP dedicated to Christmas. The Christmas EP contains five tracks, the new track "Joe and Mary" and three previously released tracks: "Christmas Time", "Reggae Christmas" and "Merry Christmas"; and a new interpretation of "Must Be Santa", a 1960s Christmas song, performed in 2009 by Bob Dylan. At the end of November 2019, the album The Christmas Present by the British singer-songwriter Robbie Williams is released, Adams participates in the duet with Williams in the song Christmas (Baby Please Come Home).

 2020s 
On 13 November 2020, Adams was featured on "Stop Crying Your Heart Out" as part of the BBC Radio 2's Allstars' Children in Need charity single. The single debuted at number seven on the Official UK Singles Chart and number one on both the Official UK Singles Sales Chart and the Official UK Singles Download Chart. On 7 December 2020, Adams announced a series of UK concerts following the long hiatus of the "Shine a Light Tour" caused by the COVID-19 pandemic and the cancellation of a sold out 17-date tour with Bon Jovi in US arenas.

In July 2021, Adams signed a deal with Bertelsmann Music Group (BMG) to release his next album.

On 11 October 2021, Adams released the title track of his 15th studio album, So Happy It Hurts. The album was released in March 2022. Adams also announced dates for a worldwide tour starting in February 2022. The single So Happy It Hurts from this album was nominated in the Best Rock Performance category of the 2023 Grammy Awards. 

On 17 December 2021, Adams announced the cancellation of all remaining tours and concerts for the year, including his New Year's Eve show in Vancouver, due to both concerns and restrictions due to the SARS-CoV-2 Omicron variant.

On 15 February 2022, through his official instagram profile, he announced the publication on his official YouTube channel of new versions of the 16 songs of Pretty Woman: The Musical sung by Adams himself, the songs were co-written by Adams and Jim Vallance, after the release of the album recorded by the cast of the musical in the October 2018.

On 1 April 2022, Adams released Classic, an album of reworked and reimagined hits. This was followed on 29 July 2022, with Classic Pt II.

 Pretty Woman: The Musical 
Adams approached Disney in 2009 to see if they would be interested in making the 1990 film into Pretty Woman: The Musical for Broadway. But it wasn't until seven years later that he re-approached them and was introduced to producer Paula Wagner who put him together with director Jerry Mitchell. Adams recruited Jim Vallance, and the two of them spent the next two years writing the music and lyrics, and completed the songs in March 2018. The musical made its debut on Broadway in August 2018 and opened in London's West End on 13 February 2020.

 Artistry 
 Voice and timbre 
 

Adams' voice has been described as a "sandpaper tenor that's a cross between Joe Cocker and Bruce Springsteen".

 Musical style 
Adams has played various styles of rock, from hard rock and arena rock to pop rock and soft rock. During the first few years of his career in the 1970s Adams fronted Canadian glam rock band Sweeney Todd; the band played hard rock as well as glam rock. His early songs were about kids and about the lives of young people, and he is known for his romantic ballads. Adams has never shied away from political or social commentary, especially with songs such as "Native Son" and "Remembrance Day" from the album Into the Fire, "Don't Drop That Bomb on Me" from Waking Up the Neighbours, and "Ultimate Love" from Ultimate. In 1978, after meeting with the drummer and main songwriter Jim Vallance for Canadian rock band Prism under the pseudonym "Rodney Higgs", the initial course was quite difficult. Demos of Adams' early songs were rejected by numerous record companies.

In 1978, the Adams–Vallance duo managed to sign their record deal with A&M Records and released the single "Let Me Take You Dancing". It is notable for being Adams' first solo single and his first-ever release as a solo artist, when he was 19. The genre of the single was disco; the melody, a piano riff inspired by Robbie King, was composed by Vallance on his parents' piano during the Christmas holidays in 1977; Adams, meanwhile, helped turn the riff into a song. In 1982, Vallance and Adams received a call from producer Michael James Jackson to contribute some songs for the next Kiss album. Although Vallance and Adams were not fans of heavy metal, it was a golden opportunity for exposure for their songs by a world-class rock group. In collaboration with Gene Simmons, the track "War Machine" and a rewrite "Rock 'n Roll Hell" were recorded by Kiss for the album Creatures of the Night. Adams' first solo albums, Bryan Adams and You Want It You Got It, two clear-cut rock and hard rock albums, respectively, indicated the styles that Adams would become famous for. In 1983, with the release of Cuts Like a Knife, Reckless and Into the Fire, their music was characterized by being hard rock with melodic overtones and powerful ballads (known as power ballads); the production of the first five albums was in cooperation with the American record producer Bob Clearmountain.

In the 1990s, with the release of Waking Up the Neighbours in 1991, produced by Robert John "Mutt" Lange, they left the hard rock sound and released an album closer to classic rock and roll, taking inspiration from the sounds of bands and artists such as Def Leppard and Foreigner. This album is based on these tones, which brings out a leap in notoriety and also in musical quality to the Canadian rocker, placing itself right in the middle between the sounds of and those of "18 Til 'I Die". Without forgetting that just after "Wakin 'up the Neighbors" will come the best So Far So Good, assisted by this album, which churns out some of the singles that Adams fans. In 1996, with his album 18 til I Die, Adams and Lange adopted a pop rock sound more in line with the style of the time. Many ballads were included in this work, although it also contained some rock songs such as "18 til I Die" and "The Only Thing That Looks Good on Me Is You". The album sees the collaboration of the American singer and songwriter Gretchen Peters, still active today. In 1998, On a Day Like Today was released, co-produced by his compatriot Bob Rock, he opted for a sound oriented to pop rock, heavily influenced by contemporary bands.

Upon their return in 2000 with the album Room Service, Adams produced the album and co-wrote the songs with various co-writers, the themes of the songs being varied between street life, touring, truth, love and relationships. He again opted for a rock-oriented sound. In 2008, with 11, produced by the same Adams with the collaboration of Mutt lange, he sees the return of his long-time collaborator Jim Vallance after more than 15 years, he has experienced a sound softer, combining songs from soft rock, pop rock and melodic rock. With Get Up produced entirely by Jeff Lynne, they continued in the line of rock, with the strong influence of Lynne's fifty-year experience. In 2019, with Shine a Light, he combined rock with pop rock and R&B.

 Influences and favourite musicians 
 Among his youthful influences, the musician has often mentioned Elvis Presley and Bob Dylan as well as all the pop and rock heard as a boy on the radio. While making the album cover version Tracks of My Years, the album was released in 2014, Adams in an interview published by the Canadian newspaper The Globe and Mail, Adams said the real influences in my life, I would record a lot of hard rock from the 1970s. According to Adams, most of those songs are untouchable.

His main sources of inspiration also include guitarists, besides Blackmore, he was influenced by guitarists such as Jimmy Page, Eric Clapton, Mick Ronson, Jeff Beck, Peter Frampton and Eddie Van Halen. Other influential and favourite artists were Alice Cooper, Black Sabbath, Humble Pie, Bob Marley, Bob Seger, Chuck Berry, David Bowie, Jackie Wilson, Joe Cocker, John Lennon, Led Zeppelin, Leonard Cohen, Ray Charles, Sam Cooke, The Beatles, The Who, The Beach Boys, The Rolling Stones and Van Morrison.

 Impact and legacy 
With the mainstream success of Reckless in the 1980s, five times multi-platinum "Album of the Year" and in the top 20 in "The Best AOR Albums Of All Time" according to Kerrang! Magazine, the true masterpiece of the Canadian rocker according to the Italian magazine Panorama, and Waking Up The Neighbors in the 1990s, having gained worldwide circulation, Adams' impact still persists today. Being one of the most popular rock artists of the 80s and 90s, the merit of having maintained a pure rock at that time as the world went into Hip hop music and Electronic music.

Referred to as the "Groover From Vancouver", he is known for his powerful rock songs and romantic ballads, and his music has appeared in dozens of films both as a singer and as a songwriter and co-writer since the early 1980s, including Class, A Night in Heaven, Real Genius, Renegades, Pink Cadillac, An Innocent Man, Problem Child 2, Robin Hood: Prince of Thieves, The Cutting Edge, The Three Musketeers, Don Juan DeMarco, The Mirror Has Two Faces, Jack, Red Corner, Hope Floats, Spirit: Stallion of the Cimarron, House of Fools, Devil's Gate, Racing Stripes, Color Me Kubrick, The Guardian, Bobby, Cashback, Bridge to Terabithia, Old Dogs, Jock the Hero Dog and Legends of Oz: Dorothy's Return.

 Activism and humanitarian work 

 Humanitarian work 
Most of Adams's philanthropic activity is through The Bryan Adams Foundation, which "aims to improve the quality of people's lives around the world by providing financial grants to support specific projects that are committed to bettering the lives of other people". The foundation is mostly funded by Adams himself.

Since the 1980s, Adams has participated in concerts and other activities to help raise money and awareness for a variety of causes. His first high-profile charity appearance came in 1985 when he opened the US transmission of Live Aid from Philadelphia. In June of the next year, Adams participated in the two-week Amnesty International "A Conspiracy of Hope" tour alongside Sting, U2 and Peter Gabriel. In 1986, Adams performed at The Prince's Trust All-Star Rock Concert in Wembley Arena to celebrate first 10 years of the Trust and again in June 1987 at the 5th Annual Prince's Trust Rock Gala along with Elton John, George Harrison, Ringo Starr and others. The following year on 11 June 1988, Adams performed at the Nelson Mandela birthday party concert at Wembley Stadium. In June 1988, East Berlin experienced a lavish rock'n'roll festival called Peace Concert: Adams and Joe Cocker played in Weißensee in front of a crowd of over 85,000 people. Only a week later, David Bowie played music in front of the Reichstag building, in front of 60,000 fans. While Pink Floyd and Michael Jackson were in front of the Bundestag, with 40,000 people to attend the concert, Bruce Springsteen performed in front of a crowd of over 160,000 people.

In March 1989, he performed on the Greenpeace album Rainbow Warriors, which was also released in the Soviet Union on the Melodiya label. According to Greenpeace, worldwide sales raised more than eight million dollars for Greenpeace initiatives. Highlights of the set include Somebody by Bryan Adams, a live version of Pride (In the Name of Love) by U2 and the hits by The Pretenders, R.E.M., Sting, Grateful Dead, Thompson Twins, Peter Gabriel and Dire Straits.

In July 1989, Adams committed to work on another charity record: the remake of the Deep Purple classic "Smoke on the Water" for Rock Aid Armenia to obtain funds for the earthquake that occurred in Armenia at that time. Adams helped commemorate the fall of the Berlin Wall when, in 1990, he joined many other guests (including his songwriting partner Michael Kamen) for Roger Waters' massive performance of The Wall in Berlin, Germany. He performed the Pink Floyd songs "What Shall We Do Now?" and "Young Lust" during the performance of The Wall, and then joined Waters, Joni Mitchell, Cyndi Lauper, Van Morrison, Paul Carrack and others to perform Waters' "The Tide Is Turning" to close the concert. On 2 March 1993, Adams attended the Rock for the Rainforest, benefit concert hosted by Rainforest Foundation Fund is a charitable foundation founded in 1987 and dedicated to the focus on rainforests and defend rights of the indigenous peoples who live there. hosted by Sting and his wife Trudie Styler. The event, which took place at Carnegie Hall in New York City, was attended by Sting, Tina Turner, James Taylor, George Michael, Tom Jones and Dustin Hoffman. $800,000 was raised for the evening. On 24 April 1993, he participated in the benefit concert Farm Aid at the Jack Trice Stadium in Ames.

On 10 December 1997, Adams took part in a concert, "A Gift of Song : A Concert To Benefit The Children Of The World", in celebration of the US Committee for UNICEF 50th Anniversary, held at the Z-100 Jingle Ball Madison Square Garden in New York City.

On 29 January 2005, Adams joined the CBC benefit concert in Toronto for victims of the 2004 Indian Ocean earthquake. Twenty years after performing at Live Aid in the US, Adams played at Canada's Live 8 show in Barrie, Ontario. Later that year, he performed in Qatar and raised GB£1.5M (US$2,617,000) from the concert. He also auctioned a white Fender Stratocaster guitar signed by many of the world's prominent guitarists. The guitar raised a total of US$3.7 million for charity and thus set a record as the world's costliest guitar. The money went to Qatar's "Reach Out to Asia" campaign to help the underprivileged across the continent. Money raised also went to some of his own projects like rebuilding a school in Thailand and building a new sports center in Sri Lanka, both of which had been devastated by the Indian Ocean tsunami.

On 25 May 2005, Adams raised £1.3M with cousin Johnny Armitage, from a concert and auction entitled Rock by the River for the Royal Marsden Hospital in London. On 15 May 2006, Adams returned to London to attend the Hope Foundation's event (hosted by designer Bella Freud), helping to raise a portion of the £250,000 to support the Palestinian refugee children. The following June, he offered individuals from the public the chance to bid to sing with him live in concert at three different charity auctions in London. Over £50,000 was raised with money going to the NSPCC, Children in Need, and the University College Hospital. On 28 February 2008, he appeared in One Night Live at the Air Canada Centre in Toronto with Josh Groban, Sarah McLachlan, Jann Arden, and RyanDan in aid of the Sunnybrook Hospital Women and Babies Program.

On 29 January 2006, Adams became the first Western artist to perform in Karachi, Pakistan after the September 11th attacks in conjunction with a benefit concert by Shehzad Roy to raise money for underprivileged children to go to school. Some of the proceeds of that concert also went to victims of the 2005 Pakistan earthquake.

On 18 October 2007, Adams was billed to perform in Tel Aviv and Jericho as part of the OneVoice Movement concerts, hoping to aid in solving the Israeli–Palestinian conflict. The peace concert for supporters of a two-state solution to the conflict with Israel was called off because of security concerns.

On 13 January 2010, he received the Allan Waters Humanitarian Award for participating in numerous concerts and charity campaigns.

On 13 January 2011, he participated in the Concert for Killing Cancer at the Hammersmith Apollo in London together with the historic rock band The Who, Jeff Beck, Debbie Harry, and Richard Ashcroft. On 22 October 2013, he attended the TJ Martell Foundation's 38th Annual Honors Gala in New York City for Cancer Research. He performed alongside Sting.

On 14 September 2014, Adams was the first artist to sing at the Invictus Games organised by Prince Harry in East London. Prince Harry reciprocated by attending Adams's exhibition on Wounded soldiers in London. Interviewed in November 2014 by KALTBLUT Magazine, he presents his photo book Wounded: The Legacy of War then Adams said:  "War is not the answer in solving problems. Sometimes, in 2004, George Bush said that "the world without Saddam Hussein's regime is a better and safer place, and as we have seen, nothing could be further from the truth. Millions of displaced people, hundreds of thousands of dead, and countless thousands of injured, physically or mentally. It is an unspeakable disaster, like the war in Afghanistan."

In May 2015, he received the "Allan Slaight Humanitarian Spirit Award" in recognition of his social activism and support for various humanitarian causes, presented during Canadian Music Week at the Canadian Music Industry & Broadcast Awards Gala. In 2016, Adams canceled an 14 April concert at Mississippi Coast Coliseum in Biloxi. From 1 July, the state implemented the law whereby religious groups and private companies can refuse to provide their services to same-sex couples; after the example of Bruce Springsteen, who canceled his show in Greensboro, North Carolina in protest against the law prohibiting anti-discrimination measures against gays, lesbians, bisexuals and transgenders in using public restrooms, Adams also followed "the Boss".

On 30 September 2017, Adams, along with Bruce Springsteen, met on stage at the 2017 Invictus Games. The Paralympic Games for Military Veterans, now in its third edition, saw the two artists perform for the closing ceremony at the Scotiabank Arena in Toronto. They performed some pieces of their repertoire, to close in duet performing "Cuts Like A Knife" and "Badlands".

In November 2019, Adams gifted Park Walk Primary School in Chelsea, England, with a new playground through his charity The Bryan Adams Foundation. In previous years, Adams had built a playground for Ashburnham Community School in the Royal Borough of Kensington and Chelsea in London with his foundation.

For his Shine a Light world tour in 2019, Adams teamed up with shipping company DHL for an environmental project to plant a tree for every ticket sold during the course of the tour. In April 2020, he participates in the recording of the song "Lean on Me" together with an ad hoc supergroup of Canadian musicians accredited as ArtistsCAN, both in homage to the recent death of Bill Withers and for raise money for the Canadian Red Cross during the COVID-19 pandemic.

In November 2020, he participates with other artists in the song "Stop Crying Your Heart Out", proposed in a cover performed for the charitable cause of Children in Need under the supervision of BBC Radio 2.

 Animal rights activism 
During his tours of 1992–1994, Adams successfully campaigned for the Southern Ocean Whale Sanctuary with Greenpeace Chairman David McTaggart. The two of them distributed over 500,000 postcards at concerts around the world encouraging people to write to politicians of countries blocking the vote, encouraging them to vote "yes" for the creation of the sanctuary at the meetings of the International Whaling Commission. IWC officially created the sanctuary on 26 May 1994.

On 10 November 2002, Adams participated in the benefit concert at the Royal Opera House in London for the Dian Fossey Gorilla Fund International. He played "Run to You" and "Crazy Little Thing Called Love" with Brian May.

Adams in a 2007 interview for PETA said:  "I've been vegetarian for about 17–18 years now, since I was about 28. And of course, my motto has always been If you love animals, don't eat them. I'm opposed to fur and any kind of use of animal products. I don't eat them, and I don't wear them. I'm not for the killing of any creature-whether it be seals, cows, dogs, anything. So anytime it comes to any kind of animal cruelty, I'm totally against it. Being sympathetic to animal rights is just something that came very naturally to me. But the moment I began to understand what was going on with the treatment of animals, it led me more and more in the way of the path I am [on] now, which is a complete vegan."

In April 2019, while off the coast of St. Vincent and the Grenadines, Adams physically intervened to protect a whale from being killed when local whalers tried to harpoon it within a conservation zone. He is the president of the St. Vincent and the Grenadines Environment Fund, a non-profit company registered in Saint Vincent and the Grenadines to support sustainable initiatives to promote the preservation of the beauty and natural value of the islands.

In May 2020, Adams was criticized for a profane social media post blaming the COVID-19 pandemic on "bat eating". Even though Adams did not single out any particular race in his remarks, online response was immediate and "Bryan Adams racist" began trending on social media. Adams later apologized for the comments stating, "To any and all that took offence...No excuse, I just wanted to have a rant about the horrible animal cruelty in these wet-markets being the possible source of the virus, and promote veganism. I have love for all people and my thoughts are with everyone dealing with this pandemic around the world."

 Photography 

Adams also works as a photographer. On 16 September 2015, he was given an Honorary Fellowship of the Royal Photographic Society in London for his work in photography. Adams has been published in British Vogue, L'uomo Vogue, American Vanity Fair, Harper's Bazaar, British GQ, Esquire, Interview magazine and i-D, and shot advertising and PR campaigns for Hugo Boss, Guess Jeans, Sand, Converse, Montblanc, John Richmond, Fred Perry, Escada, Gaastra, Zeiss, Joop, Zeiss AG, Schwarzkopf, Ermenegildo Zegna, AGL shoes, Windsor, Jaguar and OPEL cars.

He won three Lead Awards in Germany for his fashion photography, most recently in October 2015 for his story in Helmut Berger, and previously in June 2012 and again in 2006. He founded the art fashion Zoo Magazine, based in Berlin, for which he shoots regularly.

His first retrospective book of photos was released by Steidl in October 2012 titled Exposed. Previous published collaborations include American Women (2005), for Calvin Klein in the United States; proceeds from this book went to Memorial Sloan Kettering Cancer Center in New York City for their breast cancer research programs, and Made in Canada (1999) for Flare Magazine in Canada; proceeds went to the Canadian Breast Cancer Foundation. Both books were dedicated to his friend Donna, who died of the disease.

In 2002, Adams was invited, along with other photographers from the Commonwealth, to photograph Queen Elizabeth II during her Golden Jubilee; one of the photographs from this session was used as a Canadian postage stamp in 2004 and again in 2005 (see Queen Elizabeth II domestic rate stamp (Canada)), another portrait of both Queen Elizabeth II and Prince Philip is now in the National Portrait Gallery in London.

Adams supports the Hear the World initiative as a photographer in its aim to raise global awareness for the topic of hearing and hearing loss. Adams released a photography book entitled Wounded – The Legacy of War (2013) to highlight the human consequences of war.

In the summer of 2021, he shot the 48th edition of Pirelli Calendar in two working days in June in Los Angeles, where most of the cast met, followed by a day of work at Capri at the end of July. The Pirelli 2022 Calendar shot by Adams is called «On the road», portrays talents from the world of music that Adams has brought together in a journey through very different nationalities, musical genres, ages and professional paths. He photographed Iggy Pop, Rita Ora, Cher, Grimes, Normani, Kali Uchis, Jennifer Hudson, Saweetie, St. Vincent and Bohan Phoenix.

Adams has also photographed many of his colleagues in the music business. Other album covers featuring work by Adams include those for:
Annie Lennox – The Annie Lennox CollectionAmy Winehouse – Lioness: Hidden TreasuresStatus Quo – Aquostic (Stripped Bare)Diana Krall – WallflowerAnastacia – Ultimate CollectionRammstein – ZeitOther famous artists that Adams collaborated with photographing them include Hillary Clinton, Ben Kingsley, Katie Couric, Jennifer Aniston, Gwyneth Paltrow, Scarlett Johansson, Hilary Swank, Serena Williams, Venus Williams, Lindsay Lohan, L'Wren Scott, Julianne Moore, Jerry Hall, Heather Graham, Sean Penn, Wim Wenders, Danny Trejo, Christie Brinkley, Sarah Jessica Parker, Neve Campbell, Renée Zellweger, Monica Bellucci, Eva Riccobono, Elisabetta Canalis, Caterina Murino, Elle Macpherson, Eartha Kitt, Ray Liotta, Cindy Crawford, Tereza Maxová, Alice Sebold, Amber Valletta, Katie Holmes, Kate Moss, Eve Ensler, Helena Bonham Carter, Daphne Guinness, Aline Weber, Lucy Liu, Laetitia Casta, Tilda Swinton, Lauren Hutton, Muhammad Ali, Dustin Hoffman, Ben Kingsley, Lukas Podolski, Natalia Vodianova, Naomi Campbell, Louise Bourgeois, Kate Moss, Nadja Auermann, Michael J. Fox, Mickey Rourke, Judi Dench, Justin Trudeau, Margaret Atwood, Linda Evangelista, Amanda Murphy, Mads Mikkelsen, and many more.

 Publications Made in Canada (1999)American Women (2005)Exposed (Steidl, 2012)Wounded – The Legacy of War (Steidl, 2013)Untitled (Steidl, 2015)Canadians (Steidl, 2017)Homeless (Steidl, 2019)

 Exhibitions 
 Royal Ontario Museum, Toronto 1999
 McCord Museum, Montréal 2000
 Saatchi Gallery, London 2000
 Photokina, Cologne 2001
 Temple of Hadrian, Rome, July – 2006
 Fotografija Galerija, Ljubljana, Slovenia, November 2006
 PHotoEspaña, Madrid, Spain, May–July 2007
 Nunnington Hall, North Yorkshire, England, May–June 2007
 401 projects, New York City, September–November 2007
 National Portrait Gallery, London, February–May 2008
 Haus Der Kunst, Munich, May 2008
 14th Street Gallery, Hear the World Ambassadors Photo Exhibition, New York City, May 2008
 Saatchi Gallery, Hear The World Ambassadors, London, July 2009
 Calvin Klein American women 2010, New York, September 2010 
 Multimedia Art Museum, Moscow, July 2012 (Exposed)
 Goss-Michael Gallery, Dallas, Texas. "Bryan Adams – Exposed" December 2012 February 2013
 Oklahoma Contemporary, Oklahoma City. "Bryan Adams – Exposed" February – May 2013
 NRW-Forum, Düsseldorf, Germany. "Bryan Adams – Exposed" February – May 2013
 Marfa Contemporary, Marfa, Texas. "Bryan Adams – Exposed" May – August 2013
 Ostlicht Galerie, Vienna, Austria. "Bryan Adams – Exposed" June – September 2013
 Akira Ikeda Gallery, Berlin, Germany. "Bryan Adams – Exposed" September – November 2013
 Glenbow Museum, Calgary, Canada. "Bryan Adams – Exposed" February – May 2014
 Westlicht Gallery, Vienna, Austria. "Bryan Adams – Exposed"
 Stadtgalerie, Klagenfurt, Austria. "Bryan Adams – Exposed" July 3 – 5 October 2014: "Bryan Adams – Exposed"
 Stadthaus Ulm, Germany. "Bryan Adams – Exposed" June – September 2014
 MNBAQ, Quebec City, Canada. "Bryan Adams s'expose" February 19–14 June 2015
 Somerset House, London, England. "Bryan Adams – Wounded: The Legacy of War" November 2014 – January 2015
 Centro Cultural, Cascais, Portugal. "Bryan Adams – Exposed" October 2014 – February 2015
 Young Gallery, Brussels, Belgium. "Bryan Adams – Exposed" September 11, 28 November 2015
 Center of Contemporary Art Znaki Czasu,Toruń, Poland. "Bryan Adams – Exposed" November 2015 – January 2016
 Fotografiska, Stockholm, Sweden. "Bryan Adams – Exposed" 18 June 2016 – 25 September 2016
 Vivacom Art Hall, Sofia, Bulgaria. "Bryan Adams – Exposed" October 11 – 12 November 2016
 Werkhallen, Bonn, Germany. "Bryan Adams – Exposed" February 19 – 20 May 2017
 Royal Ontario Museum, Toronto. "Canadians" 2017
 Embassy of Canada, Washington. "Canadians" 2017
 Photo Gallery, Halmstad, Sweden. "Bryan Adams – Exposed" January 20–30 April 2018
 Camera Work Gallery, Berlin, Germany. "Bryan Adams – Exposed" 8 December 2018 – 9 February 2019
 Izzy Gallery, Toronto, Canada. "Bryan Adams – Exposed" July 2–28, 2019
 Fotografiska, Tallinn, Estonia. "Bryan Adams – Exposed" March 6 – 20 September 2020
 Gericke + Paffrath Gallery, Düsseldorf, Germany. "Bryan Adams – Exposed" October 2–31 January 2021
 Leica Gallery, Munich, Germany. "Bryan Adams – Exposed" October 29–31 January 2021
 Atlas Gallery, London, United Kingdom. "Bryan Adams – Homeless" April 29–12 June 2021
 IPFO House of Photography, Olten, Switzerland. "Bryan Adams – Exposed" 18 November 2021 - 6 February 2022
 Osthaus-Museum Hagen, Hagen, Germany. "Bryan Adams – Exposed" February 20–10 April 2022
 Leica Galerie, Milan, Italy. "Bryan Adams – Exposed" April 21–9 July 2022

 Personal life 
Adams became a vegan in 1989. He told Vegan Life Magazine in a 2016 interview, "For those people who aren't veggie or vegan it was the best gift I could ever give myself to do it. I am turning 57 years old this year and I work hard, I am always on the move but I have tons of energy because I am plant-based. It is absolutely the best thing you could ever do for yourself. It is a great path."

Adams has never married. In the 1990s, he was in a relationship with Danish model Cecilie Thomsen. Adams and Alicia Grimaldi, his former personal assistant and now trustee and co-founder of his namesake foundation, had their first daughter in April 2011 and their second daughter in February 2013. He maintains homes in London and Paris.

On 30 October 2021, Adams cancelled his participation in a tribute to singer Tina Turner, just before the Rock and Roll Hall of Fame ceremony, after testing positive for COVID-19. On 25 November 2021, he tested positive for COVID-19 for the second time, and was placed in a hotel for a two-week quarantine in Italy.

 Awards and honours 

Adams's awards and nominations include 20 Juno Awards among 56 nominations and 15 Grammy Award nominations, including a win for Best Song Written Specifically for a Motion Picture or Television in 1992. For his songwriting for films, Adams has been nominated for three times for Academy Awards and five Golden Globe Awards. He was nominated for his fifth Golden Globe in 2007 for songwriting for the film Bobby; the song was performed by Aretha Franklin and Mary J. Blige. In 2008, Adams was ranked 38th on the list of all-time top artists in the Billboard Hot 100 50th Anniversary Charts.

In 1990, Adams was awarded the Order of British Columbia. On 20 April 1990, Adams was made a Member of the Order of Canada, and on 6 May 1998, was promoted within the order to the rank of Officer of the Order of Canada. He received these awards for his contributions to popular music and philanthropic work via his foundation, which helps improve education for people around the world.

On 1 May 2010, Adams received the Governor General's Performing Arts Award for his 30 years of contributions to the arts. On 13 January 2010, he received the Allan Waters Humanitarian Award for his part in numerous charitable concerts and campaigns during his career.

Adams has been inducted into the Hollywood Walk of Fame, Canada's Walk of Fame, the Canadian Broadcast Hall of Fame, and the Canadian Music Hall of Fame. Adams is also a recipient of the Queen's Golden Jubilee Medal (2002) and the Queen's Diamond Jubilee Medal (2012). In 2015, he was awarded an Honorary Fellowship by the Royal Photographic Society (FRPS). In 2023, Adams was nominated for induction into the Songwriters Hall of Fame.

 Bryan Adams Band 

Adams' backing band, known as "The Dudes of Leisure" or the "Bryan Adams Band", is the informal name given to the group of musicians who accompany Bryan Adams both in the studio and during live performances. Adams's solo career began in 1979, the band around Adams, who not only takes on singing but also rhythm guitar, is made up of guitarist Keith Scott and drummer Mickey Curry. Bassist Dave Taylor was a permanent member of the band until the late 1990s. Keyboardist Tommy Mandel has been a part since 1981 in the studio and has been playing since the late 1980s.

Other musicians over the band's span have included, U.K. keyboardist "John Hanaha" (1981–1988) and drummers "Jimmy Wesley" (1981–1983), Frankie LaRocka (1983–1985), Pat Steward (1985–1987) and "Danny Cummings" (1996–1998). Following the 1998 departure of Mandel and Taylor, the band from 1999 to 2001 consisted of only Scott on guitar, Curry, and Bryan Adams, who took on bass. Norm Fisher on bass and keyboardist Gary Breit have been in the band since 2002. Since 2016, they have alternated as session musicians and accompanists at bass concerts: Mark Wilson (2016), Richard Jones (2016), Phil Thornalley (2016–2017), and Solomon Walker (2017–present).

 Discography 

 Bryan Adams (1980)
 You Want It You Got It (1981)
 Cuts Like a Knife (1983)
 Reckless (1984)
 Into the Fire (1987)
 Waking Up the Neighbours (1991)
 18 til I Die (1996)
 On a Day Like Today (1998)
 Spirit: Stallion of the Cimarron (2002)
 Room Service (2004)
 11 (2008)
 Tracks of My Years (2014)
 Get Up (2015)
 Shine a Light (2019)
 So Happy It Hurts (2022)

 Filmography 
 Cinema 
1989 – Pink Cadillac, directed by Buddy Van Horn, starring Clint Eastwood and Bernadette Peters, Adams plays a gas station attendant.
1991 - Robin Hood: Prince Of Thieves Adams played himself in the full length video for Everything I Do playing out the end credits to the VHS release of the film.
2002 – House of Fools, directed by Andrei Konchalovsky, Adams plays himself and appears in the scenes in which the protagonist Zhanna (Julia Vysotskaya) dreams of marrying him.
2011 – Jock the Hero Dog, directed by Duncan MacNeillie. Features the voice of Adams as "Jock".

 Television 
2017 – Juno Awards of 2017 the ceremonies were held at the Canadian Tire Centre in Ottawa and televised on CTV with Adams and Russell Peters as co-hosts.

 Radio broadcasting 
 Radio programs 
Adams presents a collection of personal rock favourites:
2016 – BBC Radio 2, episodes "Bryan Adams Rocks!". Boxing Day Adams plays a selection of his favorite rock songs.
2017 – BBC Radio 2, episodes "Bryan Adams Rocks!". Adams plays personal selection of favorite rock classics and interviews to the BBC archive.
2018 – BBC Radio 2, episodes "Bryan Adams Rocks!". Adams returns to focus on one of his favourite genres progressive rock.
2018 – BBC Radio 2, episodes "Bryan Adams Rocks!". Adams chooses more of his favourite Classic rock.
2018 – BBC Radio 2, episodes "Bryan Adams Rocks!". Big Hair 80s Rock Requests, plays his favourite rock music including your requests for 80s Big Hair tracks.
2019 – BBC Radio 2, episodes "Bryan Adams Rocks!". Rocking selection from his library for Christmas day.
2019 – BBC Radio 2, episodes "Bryan Adams Rocks!". Selection from his library of the 70s, 80s, 90s and beyond for Boxing Day.
2019 – BBC Radio 2, episodes "Bryan Adams Rocks!". Recent Reissues and Box Sets, plays his favourite rock music.
2019 – BBC Radio 2, episodes "Bryan Adams Rocks!". New Names and classics from Bryan's Collection, plays his favourite rock music.

 Concert tours 
 You Want It You Got It Tour (1981–1982) (includes some opening-act dates with The Kinks and Loverboy)
 Cuts Like a Knife Tour (1983–1984) (includes some dates with Journey and The Police)
 Reckless Tour (1984–1985) (includes some opening-act dates with Tina Turner)
 A Conspiracy of Hope (1986) (shares the stage with U2, Sting, Peter Gabriel, Lou Reed, Joan Baez, and The Neville Brothers)
 Into the Fire Tour (1987–1988)
 Waking Up the World Tour (1991–1993) (includes some opening dates with ZZ Top for the Recycler Tour in stadiums in Europe).
 So Far So Good Tour (1993–1994) (includes some opening act dates with The Rolling Stones for the Voodoo Lounge Tour in United States.)
 18 Til I Die Tour (1996–1997)
 Unplugged Tour (1997–1998)
White Elephant Tour (1999) (includes some opening act dates with The Rolling Stones for the No Security Tour in North America.)
 The Best of Me Tour (1999–2001)
 Here I Am Tour (2002–2004)
 Room Service Tour (2004–2006) (includes 26 co-headlining dates with Def Leppard in United States.)
 Anthology Tour (2007–2008)
 11 Tour / Acoustic Show (2008–2009) (on some dates in the United States of America he shares the stage with the rock band Foreigner and on others with Rod Stewart.)
 The Bare Bones Tour (2010–2014) (includes dates for the Waking Up The Neighbors 20th Anniversary Tour)
 Reckless 30th Anniversary Tour (2014–2015)
 Get Up Tour (2016–2018)
 Ultimate Tour (2018)
 Shine a Light Tour (2019–2021) (on eight dates of 2019, in the United States of America, he shares the stage with Billy Idol.)
 So Happy It Hurts Tour (2022–2023)

 See also 
 Music of Canada
 Rock music of Canada
 List of animal rights advocates

 References 

 Further reading 
 Goode, Jay. Bryan Adams''. Photographed by Al Purdi & Rick Stern. [s.l.]: Monarch Books, 1986.

External links 

 
 
 
 The Bryan Adams Foundation
 Bryan Adams On A&M Records
 Vincent and the Grenadines Environment Fund
 Entry at canadianbands.com
 

 
1959 births
Living people
20th-century Canadian bass guitarists
20th-century Canadian composers
20th-century Canadian guitarists
20th-century Canadian male singers
20th-century Canadian photographers
21st-century Canadian bass guitarists
21st-century Canadian composers
21st-century Canadian guitarists
21st-century Canadian male singers
21st-century Canadian photographers
A&M Records artists
Canadian animal rights activists
Canadian anti-war activists
Canadian child singers
Canadian expatriates in England
Canadian expatriates in France
Canadian hard rock musicians
Canadian harmonica players
Canadian humanitarians
Canadian male composers
Canadian male guitarists
Canadian male pianists
Canadian male singer-songwriters
Canadian male voice actors
Canadian multi-instrumentalists
Canadian Music Hall of Fame inductees
Canadian people of English descent
Canadian people of Maltese descent
Canadian philanthropists
Canadian pop guitarists
Canadian pop pianists
Canadian pop singers
Canadian portrait photographers
Canadian record producers
Canadian rock bass guitarists
Canadian rock guitarists
Canadian rock pianists
Canadian rock singers
Canadian soft rock musicians
Canadian tenors
Decca Records artists
Fashion photographers
Governor General's Performing Arts Award winners
Grammy Award winners
Interscope Records artists
Ivor Novello Award winners
Jack Richardson Producer of the Year Award winners
Juno Award for Adult Contemporary Album of the Year winners
Juno Award for Album of the Year winners
Juno Award for Artist of the Year winners
Juno Award for International Album of the Year winners
Juno Award for Songwriter of the Year winners
Juno International Achievement Award winners
Male actors from Kingston, Ontario
Male actors from Vancouver
Male bass guitarists
Members of the Order of British Columbia
Mercury Records artists
MTV Europe Music Award winners
Musicians from Kingston, Ontario
Musicians from Vancouver
Officers of the Order of Canada
People from North Vancouver
Polydor Records artists
Universal Music Group artists